Girl Flu. is a 2016 American comedy film written and directed by Dorie Barton and starring Katee Sackhoff, Jade Pettyjohn, Jeremy Sisto, Judy Reyes and Heather Matarazzo.

Plot
12-year-old Bird has moved with her single mom Jenny from a San Fernando Valley suburb to a neighborhood in Echo Park. Compounding this transition is the arrival of Bird's first period, which makes itself embarrassingly known at a school picnic. Bird and her free-spirited, impulsive mom both learn about what it means to become a woman.

Cast 
Katee Sackhoff as Jenny
Jade Pettyjohn as Robin/Bird
Jeremy Sisto as Arlo
Heather Matarazzo as Lilli
Judy Reyes as Celeste
Diego Josef as Carlos
Isabella Acres as Rachel

Reception
The film has an 86% rating on Rotten Tomatoes.  Kate Erbland of IndieWire graded the film a B, writing "Although Bird’s issues are myriad and it would be easy for her to fall into a pattern of pitying herself, her unique mix of pluck and practicality make the character shine and keep the tone of 'Girl Flu' fizzy and light."

Jon Frosch of The Hollywood Reporter gave the film a positive review, calling it  "warm and winning" and "a slight but distinctive coming-of-ager."

Bob Strauss of the Los Angeles Daily News also gave the film a positive review and wrote, "Girl Flu. is everything indie comedy should be and rarely is: fearless, committed to character and willing to not only get dirty but to stay that way."

References

External links
 . Wayback Machine. Archived from the original on 2016-03-07.
 
 

American comedy films
2016 comedy films
2010s English-language films
American independent films
2016 independent films
Films set in Los Angeles
Films about mother–daughter relationships
Films about puberty
2010s coming-of-age comedy films
American coming-of-age comedy films
2016 directorial debut films
2010s American films